Sarah Ann Blocker (October 27, 1857 – April 15, 1944) was an American educator, a founder of Florida Memorial College. She was inducted into the Florida Women's Hall of Fame in 2003.

Early life
Blocker earned her teaching certificate in Atlanta in 1883.

Career
Blocker taught at Florida Baptist Academy from 1892, and was head of the normal department there. Blocker is credited with co-founding Florida Memorial College by arranging the merger of Florida Baptist Institute and Florida Baptist Academy, to form the Florida Memorial and Industrial Memorial Institute. Blocker was Dean of Women at the Institute by 1935. One of her students at Florida Baptist Academy was philanthropist Eartha M. M. White.  Another was author Zora Neale Hurston.

Personal life and legacy
Sarah Ann Blocker died in 1944, aged 86 years. In 2003, Sarah Ann Blocker was inducted into the Florida Women's Hall of Fame by Governor Jeb Bush. The following year, she received a posthumous honorary doctorate as part of the 125th-anniversary celebration at Florida Memorial University. There is a Sarah A. Blocker Meritorious Service Award given annually by Florida Memorial University.

References

1857 births
1944 deaths
19th-century American educators
20th-century American educators
Florida Memorial University
Educators from Florida
19th-century American women educators
20th-century American women educators